

List of Ambassadors
Anna Azari 2021–
Daniel Meron 2017–2021
Gary Koren 2013–2017
Yaakov Levy 2008–2013
Arie Arazi 2005–2008
Arthur Avnon 2001–2005
Erella Hadar, 1999–2001
Refael Gvir, 1995–1999 
Moshe Yagar, 1993–1995
Yoel Sher 1990–1993 
Shmuel Bendor, 1957–1959
Minister Shlomo Kaddar 1956–1957
Minister Arieh Leon Kubovy, 1951–1952
Minister Shmoel Elyashiv 1950–1951
Minister Ehud Avriel 1948–1950

Czech Republic
Israel